Charles W. Pavey (November 14, 1835 – May 12, 1910) was an American businessman and politician.

Born in Highland County, Ohio, Pavey moved to Mount Vernon, Illinois and was a merchant. During the American Civil War, Pavey served in the 80th Illinois Volunteer Infantry Regiment. President Chester Arthur appointed Pavey collector of internal revenue. He was also involved with the Republican Party. From 1889 to 1893, Pavey served as the Auditor of Public Accounts, State  of Illinois. From 1897 to 1908, Pavey served as an examiner for the United States Department of Justice. He then returned to Mount Vernon, Illinois because of ill health. Pavey died in Mount Vernon, Illinois after suffering a stroke.

Notes

1835 births
1910 deaths
People from Highland County, Ohio
People from Mount Vernon, Illinois
People of Illinois in the American Civil War
Businesspeople from Illinois
Illinois Republicans
Auditors of Public Accounts of Illinois
19th-century American businesspeople